The Waters House is a historic house at 515 Oak Street in Fordyce, Arkansas.  The -story Foursquare house was designed by Charles L. Thompson and built in 1907, and is one of the finest Colonial Revival houses in the city.  It has a hipped roof with flared eaves, and cross gables on the sides.  The main facade features a projecting bay that rises the full two stories, and is topped by a gable with dentil molding and flared eaves.  A single-story porch wraps around two sides of the house.

The house was listed on the National Register of Historic Places in 1982.

See also
National Register of Historic Places listings in Dallas County, Arkansas

References

Houses on the National Register of Historic Places in Arkansas
Colonial Revival architecture in Arkansas
Houses completed in 1907
Houses in Dallas County, Arkansas
Buildings and structures in Fordyce, Arkansas
National Register of Historic Places in Dallas County, Arkansas